Perekhodivka is a village in Nizhyn Raion of Chernihiv Oblast in Ukraine.

Demographics
Native language as of the Ukrainian Census of 2001:
 Ukrainian 99.62%
 Others 0.38%

Notable people
Oleksandr Konysky (1836 – 1900), writer

References

Villages in Nizhyn Raion